Catocala oberthueri is a species of moth in the family Erebidae first described by Jules Léon Austaut in 1879. It is found in Spain, Tunisia, Algeria and Morocco.

The wingspan is about 70 mm. Adults are on wing from June to July.

References

oberthueri
Moths described in 1879
Moths of Europe
Moths of Africa